Bampton Grange is a village in Cumbria, England. Haweswater Beck arises as a stream discharge from Haweswater Reservoir and flows eastward, just north of Firth Woods, and then turns north to join the River Lowther between Bampton and Bampton Grange.

See also

Listed buildings in Bampton, Cumbria

Villages in Cumbria
Bampton, Cumbria